Echinopsis deserticola,  is a species of Echinopsis found in Chile.

References

External links
 
 

deserticola